Thunder Island is a 1963 American action film directed by Jack Leewood, written by Don Devlin and Jack Nicholson, and starring Gene Nelson, Fay Spain, Brian Kelly, Míriam Colón, Art Bedard and Antonio Torres Martino.

The film was made by Robert L. Lippert's Associated Producers and released in September 1963, by 20th Century Fox.

Actor Jack Nicholson co-wrote the screenplay.

Plot

Contract killer Billy Poole is hired to assassinate a South American dictator. When he arrives, he and associate Anita Chavez arrange to have an innocent bystander, advertising man Vincent Dodge, take them by boat to the intended victim's island compound, holding Vincent's wife Helen hostage.

Poole is able only to wound his target. After killing his accomplice Anita himself, Poole is shot by Vincent, who then rescues his wife.

Cast 
Gene Nelson as Billy Poole
Fay Spain as Helen Dodge
Brian Kelly as Vincent Dodge
Míriam Colón as Anita Chavez
Art Bedard as Ramon Alou
Antonio Torres Martino as Colonel Cepeda
Esther Sandoval as Rena
José de San Antón as Antonio Perez
Evelyn Kaufman as Jo Dodge
Stephanie Rifkinson as Linda Perez

Production
Jack Nicholson co-wrote the film early in his career. He and Don Devlin were paid $1,250. The film was shot in Puerto Rico. Robert L. Lippert was impressed with Nicholson's work and hired him as a writer and actor for Flight to Fury shot in the Philippines.

References

External links 
 
Thunder Island at TCMDB
Thunder Island at BFI

1963 films
1960s action films
American action films
Films shot in Puerto Rico
Films about contract killing
20th Century Fox films
Films scored by Paul Sawtell
Films set in South America
1960s English-language films
1960s American films